The Unity Tour was the Jacksons' first concert tour in almost three decades. The tour also marked the first time the brothers have toured as the Jacksons without brother Michael, who passed away on June 25, 2009. This was also the first tour without Randy Jackson. The tour began on June 20, 2012, and ended on July 27, 2013. The lineup consisted of the four eldest Jackson brothers: Jackie, Tito, Jermaine, and Marlon.

Set list
"Can You Feel It"
"Blame It on the Boogie"
"I Wanna Be Where You Are"
"Rock with You"  
"Show You the Way to Go"
"Lovely One"
"We're Here to Entertain You" (Video Interlude)
"Good Times"
"Lookin' Through the Windows"
"Time Waits for No One"
"Heaven Knows I Love You, Girl"
"Push Me Away"
"Man of War"
"Gone Too Soon" 
"I Want You Back" / "ABC" / "The Love You Save" / "Never Can Say Goodbye"
"All I Do Is Think Of You"
"I'll Be There"
"Dynamite" 
"Let's Get Serious" 
"Do What You Do" 
"Can't Let Her Get Away" 
"This Place Hotel"
 Encore
 "Wanna Be Startin' Somethin'"  
"Don't Stop 'Til You Get Enough"  
"Shake Your Body (Down to the Ground)"

Notes
 "Let's Get Serious" was replaced by "When the Rain Begins to Fall" for European shows.

Tour dates

Cancelled dates

Personnel

Performers

Musicians
 Jermaine Jackson: vocals
 Tito Jackson: vocals; guitar
 Marlon Jackson: vocals
 Jackie Jackson: vocals
 Tommy Organ: guitar
 Brandon Brown: bass
 Kyle Bolden: guitar
 Rex Salas: keyboards/md
 Stacey Lamont Sydnor: percussion
 Chad Wright: drums
 Kenneth KT Townsend: keyboards
Dancers
 La Toya Jackson ("Shake Your Body (Down to the Ground)" only)

Box office score data

Notes

References

The Jacksons concert tours
2012 concert tours
2013 concert tours